Emilio Molinari (born 12 November 1939 in Milan)  is an Italian politician. From 1984-1985 he served as a Member of the European Parliament, representing Italy for Proletarian Democracy. From 1992–1994 he served as a Senator, representing Lombardy for the Federation of the Greens.

References

Living people
1939 births
MEPs for Italy 1984–1989
Politicians from Milan
Proletarian Democracy MEPs
Proletarian Democracy politicians
Federation of the Greens politicians